Willy Allemann (10 June 1942 – 2010) was a Swiss football defender who played for Switzerland in the 1966 FIFA World Cup. He also played for FC Grenchen and BSC Young Boys.

Allemann died in 2010.

References

1942 births
2010 deaths
Swiss men's footballers
Switzerland international footballers
Association football defenders
FC Grenchen players
1966 FIFA World Cup players